Collonista eroopolitana is a species of sea snail, a marine gastropod mollusk in the family Colloniidae.

Description
The length of the shell attains 3 mm.

Distribution
This species occurs in the Red Sea and in the Gulf of Aden.

References

 Savigny, J-.C., 1817 Description de l'Egypte, ou recueil des observations et des recherches qui ont été faites en Egypte pendant l'expédition de l'Armée française, publié par les ordres de sa Majesté l'Empereur Napoléon le Grand. Histoire Naturelle, p. 339 pp
 Bouchet, P. & Danrigal, F., 1982. Napoleon's Egyptian campaign (1798-1801) and the Savigny collection of shells. The Nautilus 96(1): 9-24
 Vine, P. (1986). Red Sea Invertebrates. Immel Publishing, London. 224 pp

External links
 Issel, A. (1869). Malacologia del Mar Rosso. Ricerche zoologiche e paleontologiche. Biblioteca Malacologica, Pisa. xi + 387 pp., pls 1-5.

eroopolitana
Gastropods described in 1869